John W. Wyatt (b. 1831/2) was a soldier in the Union Army during the American Civil War, A.M.E. minister, delegate to Florida's 1868 Constitutional Convention, state legislator, county commissioner, and justice of the peace. He was described as being illiterate and an excellent orator.

Wyatt was elected to represent Leon County in the Florida House of Representatives from 1870 until 1874. 
 
Wyatt chaired a legislative committee investigating a railroad's bonds in 1872. He also served on the Committee on Engrossed Bills.

See also
 African-American officeholders during and following the Reconstruction era

References

Republican Party members of the Florida House of Representatives
19th-century American politicians
19th-century African-American people
Year of birth missing